The 1982 Men's World Water Polo Championship was the fourth edition of the men's water polo tournament at the World Aquatics Championships, organised by the world governing body in aquatics, the FINA. The tournament was held from 29 July to 8 August 1982, and was incorporated into the 1982 World Aquatics Championships in Guayaquil, Ecuador.

Participating teams

Groups formed

Group A
 
 
 
 

Group B
 
 
 
 

Group C
 
 
 
 

Group D

First round

Group A

 29 July 1982

 30 July 1982

 31 July 1982

Group B

 29 July 1982

 30 July 1982

 31 July 1982

Group C

 29 July 1982

 30 July 1982

 31 July 1982

Group D

 29 July 1982

 30 July 1982

 31 July 1982

Second round

Group E

First round results apply.

 3 August 1982

 4 August 1982

Group F

First round results apply.

 3 August 1982

 4 August 1982

Group G

First round results apply.

 3 August 1982

 4 August 1982

Group H

First round results apply.

 3 August 1982

 4 August 1982

Final round

13th – 16th places (Group K)

Results of previous rounds apply.

 6 August 1982

 7 August 1982

9th – 12th places (Group J)

Results of previous rounds apply.

 6 August 1982

 7 August 1982

5th – 8th places (Group I)

Results of previous rounds apply.

 6 August 1982

 7 August 1982

1st - 4th places Final standings (Group L)

Results of previous rounds apply.
 6 August 1982

 7 August 1982

Final ranking

Medalists

References

External links
 4th FINA World Championships 1982, Guayaquil - Water polo Men's Tournament www.fina.org
 Men Water Polo World Championship 1982 Guyaquil www.todor66.com

Men
1982